An intentional radiator is any device that is deliberately designed to produce radio waves.

Radio transmitters of all kinds, including the garage door opener, cordless telephone, cellular phone, wireless video sender, wireless microphone, and many others fall into this category.

See also
 Spurious emission
 Unintentional radiator (incidental radiator)

Radio electronics
Garage door openers